Xavier Paluszkiewicz (born 13 December 1972) is a French politician of La République En Marche! (LREM) who served as member of the French National Assembly from 2017 to 2022, representing the department of Meurthe-et-Moselle. His father is Polish and mother Italian.

Political career
Previously employed in a Luxembourg bank, Paluszkiewicz relied on his family to finance his 33,000 euro campaign expenses for the 2017 elections.

In parliament, Paluszkiewicz served as member of the Finance Committee and the Committee on European Affairs. In addition to his committee assignments, he is part of the parliamentary friendship groups with Cuba, Luxembourg and Singapore.

He lost his seat in the 2022 French legislative election to Martine Etienne from NUPES.

Political positions
In July 2019, Paluszkiewicz decided not to align with his parliamentary group's majority and became one of 52 LREM members who abstained from a vote on the French ratification of the European Union’s Comprehensive Economic and Trade Agreement (CETA) with Canada.

See also
 2017 French legislative election

References

1972 births
Living people
Deputies of the 15th National Assembly of the French Fifth Republic
La République En Marche! politicians
People from Meurthe-et-Moselle
Politicians from Grand Est
French people of Polish descent
French people of Italian descent
Members of Parliament for Meurthe-et-Moselle